Thuan Pham is a Vietnamese-American engineer, former Chief Technology Officer (CTO) of Coupang and former CTO of Uber.

Early life
Pham was born in Vietnam. In 1979, at about age 12, Pham, his mother, and younger brother immigrated as Vietnamese boat people on a crowded, unsanitary boat to Malaysia, where they were rejected as refugees after being twice-robbed by Thai pirates. They took another boat to Indonesia, where they spent 10 months in a refugee camp with similar unsanitary conditions. His life as a refugee included swimming to another town to buy candy for his mother to resell to the refugee colony for a 10 cent profit, which was "a luxury," with food aid from organizations such as UNHCR, CARE, and Save the Children. Pham's family was granted political asylum in the United States because of his father and settled in Rockville, Maryland.  His mother, who was an accountant in Vietnam, wasn't able to get her accountant certification due to language barriers and worked as a gas station ledger keeper during the day and supermarket grocery packer at night. He lived with six others in a roach-infested, two-bedroom apartment, worked at a car wash station on the weekends, and wore donated clothes and shoes including girls' socks for two years. His father was a South Vietnamese Army soldier and teacher, who stayed in Saigon.

Pham graduated from Richard Montgomery High School in 1986, and the Massachusetts Institute of Technology with a BS in computer science in 1990, and MS degree in 1991.

Career
Pham worked at Hewlett-Packard for three years, then Silicon Graphics. He was the fourth engineer at Internet ad serving startup NetGravity, and then joined DoubleClick after their acquisition of NetGravity in 1999. He then worked at VMware for eight years.

Uber
In 2013, he was personally hired as the Uber Chief Technology Officer (CTO) by the CEO, Travis Kalanick, who was impressed by his technical skills after interviewing him for 30 hours over two weeks. In 2016, Pham's internal email to employees commenting, "I will not even utter the name of this deplorable person because I do not accept him as my leader" on the election of U.S. President Trump, who is anti immigration, was widely circulated and published by the media.

In 2017, it was reported that Pham had knowledge of Susan Fowler's sexual harassment allegation at Uber and her manager's threatened retaliation, and did nothing. These allegations were later shown to be false by follow-up investigative reports and by a Buzzfeed publication of an email from Pham to the engineering team to clarify the matter. In the same week, Pham stopped working alongside Uber's SVP of Engineering Amit Singhal, who was asked by the CEO, Kalanick, to resign after a month for failing to disclose a sexual harassment claim during Singhal's 15 years as VP of Google Search, after Recode reported about it in media.

Resignation
On April 24, 2020, an SEC filing  indicated that Thuan Pham will be resigning as of May 2020.

Personal life
Pham is a naturalized citizen of the United States.  In 2016, he was listed among the "2016 Great Immigrants Honorees: The Pride of America" by the Carnegie Corporation of New York.
Pham enjoys playing tennis in his personal life.

References

Year of birth missing (living people)
Vietnamese emigrants to the United States
Vietnamese refugees
People from Rockville, Maryland
MIT School of Engineering alumni
American computer programmers
American software engineers
Uber people
American technology chief executives
21st-century American businesspeople
American transportation businesspeople
Businesspeople in software
Living people
People with acquired American citizenship